Safety Col is a snow-covered col, 185 m high, between Red Rock Ridge and the Blackwall Mountains, on the west coast of Graham Land. First surveyed in 1936 by the British Graham Land Expedition (BGLE) under Rymill. Resurveyed in 1948-49 by the Falkland Islands Dependencies Survey (FIDS), and so named by them because the col affords a safe sledging route between Neny Fjord and Rymill Bay when there is open water off the west end of Red Rock Ridge.

Mountain passes of Graham Land
Fallières Coast